Türkədi or Tyurkedi or Tyurkedy may refer to:
Türkədi, Kurdamir, Azerbaijan
Türkədi, Sabirabad, Azerbaijan